Jack Keenan (14 September 1929 – 21 June 2009) was a Canadian boxer. He competed in the men's middleweight event at the 1948 Summer Olympics. At the 1948 Summer Olympics, he lost to Mick McKeon of Ireland.

References

1929 births
2009 deaths
Canadian male boxers
Olympic boxers of Canada
Boxers at the 1948 Summer Olympics
Boxers from Montreal
Middleweight boxers